Universe Today (U.T.) is a popular North American-based non-commercial space and astronomy news website. The domain was registered on December 30, 1998, and the website went live in March 1999, founded by Canadian Fraser Cain. The Universe Today assumed its current form on July 24, 2003, featuring astronomy news and space-related issues.

By early September 2005, the forum section merged with Bad Astronomy as a combined site with the BAUT forum. During April 2011, the Association of British Science Writers noted that Universe Today decided not to make preparations for reporting on embargoed stories until they are public knowledge.

Emily Lakdawalla said that she relies on Universe Today and Bad Astronomy to "give ... an independent look at big news stories".

Publications 
Universe Today has published two books, which are available both as e-books and on physical media:

See also 
 Astronomy Cast
 Space.com
 The Space Show

References

External links 
 Official website of Universe Today

Astronomy websites
Canadian news websites
1999 establishments in the United States